William Benjamin Bensussen (born November 7, 1982), better known by his stage name The Gaslamp Killer, is an American alternative hip hop producer and DJ based in Los Angeles, California.

Career
He grew up in San Diego, California, where he became a DJ in the Gaslamp district. His sets often ruined the music vibe in the clubs, earning him the nickname "The Gaslamp Killer".

After moving to Los Angeles in 2006, he helped found Low End Theory, "L.A.'s monolithic weekly showcase for uncut beat-driven tracks".

The Gaslamp Killer has played at Coachella Valley Music and Arts Festival, the Austin Psych Fest, the Decibel Festival, and the Voodoo Fest.

He produced Gonjasufi's debut album, A Sufi and a Killer, with Flying Lotus and Mainframe in 2010.

In August 2012, he released a single, "Flange Face" b/w "Seven Years of Bad Luck for Fun", which was listed by Pitchfork as their "Best New Track" of July 2012. His debut album, Breakthrough, was released in September 2012.

In 2015, he released a live album, The Gaslamp Killer Experience: Live in Los Angeles. In 2016, he released a studio album, Instrumentalepathy. In 2020, he released his latest album Heart Math.

Personal life
He is Jewish, and his ancestry includes Turkish, Lebanese, Mexican and Lithuanian. His great-uncle is activist Herbert Aptheker.

In 2017, he was accused of rape by a woman named Chelsea Tadros, who claimed he met her and another woman at the Standard Hotel in 2013, and “had non-consensual sex with both of us while we were completely incapacitated.” Bensussen replied with a $5 million defamation lawsuit. In 2019, the suit was settled with a joint statement:  "After their discussions, Ms. Tadros acknowledges she does not know who drugged her, and both parties recognized that Ms. Tadros could have been drugged by one of the many attendees that were present on July 5th, 2013. Ms. Tadros continues to maintain that she was drugged and thereby unable to consent on July 5, 2013. Mr. Bensussen maintains that he has never drugged or raped anyone, and that he did not have any indication that Ms. Tadros was drugged or unable to consent."

Discography

Studio albums
 Breakthrough (2012)
 Instrumentalepathy (2016)
 Break Stuff (2019)
 Heart Math (2020)

Live albums
 The Gaslamp Killer Experience: Live in Los Angeles (2015)

EPs
 The Killer Robots (2008) (with Free the Robots)
 My Troubled Mind (2009)
 Death Gate (2010)

Singles
 "Impulse" (2010) (with Daedelus)
 "Flange Face" b/w "Seven Years of Bad Luck for Fun" (2012)
 "Brass Sabbath" (2013) (with Jungle by Night)
 "Murder Man" (2015) (with Mophono)
 "Residual Tingles" (2016)

Mixes
 Gaslamp Killers (2007)
 It's a Rocky Road: Volume 1 (2007)
 It's a Rocky Road: Volume 2 (2007)
 I Spit on Your Grave (2008)
 We Make It Good Mix Series Volume 5 (2008)
 Akuma No Chi Ga Odoru (2009)
 All Killer: Finders Keepers Records 1-20 Mixed by The Gaslamp Killer (2009)
 Hell and the Lake of Fire Are Waiting for You! (2009)
 Vs Finders Keepers (2009)
 A Decade of Flying Lotus (2010)
 Helio x GLK (2013)
 Lavender AM: Meditation Mix (2013)

Productions
 Flying Lotus - "GNG BNG" from Los Angeles (2008)
 The Beastmaster - Have You Ever Bled from Your Eyes? Do You Want To? (2009)
 Gonjasufi - "Kobwebz" and "Kowboyz & Indians" from A Sufi and a Killer (2010)

Guest appearances
 Free the Robots - Free the Robots (2008)
 Prefuse 73 - Everything She Touched Turned Ampexian (2009)
 Nocando - "Hurry Up and Wait" from Jimmy the Lock (2010)

Compilation appearances
 The Change Up EP-V.01 (2006)
 T7L: Audio Promo Disc 707 (2007)
 ArtDontSleep Presents... From L.A. with Love (2007)
 Echo Expansion (2007)
 Secret Hangout (2007)
 Brainfeeder Sampler (2008)
 Warp Records Spring 2008 (2008)
 Stussy x TurntableLab - Beats (2008)
 Dublab Presents: Echo Expansion (2009)
 Choice on 12 (2010)
 Radio Galaxia (2010)
 Low End Theory Podcast (2010)

References

External links
 
 

Alternative hip hop musicians
American DJs
American hip hop record producers
Hispanic and Latino American entertainers
Living people
American musicians of Mexican descent
Musicians from California
People from San Diego
Jewish American musicians
American people of Lebanese-Jewish descent
American people of Lithuanian-Jewish descent
American people of Turkish-Jewish descent
American people of Mexican-Jewish descent
Jewish hip hop record producers
Hispanic and Latino American musicians
Brainfeeder artists
Record producers from California
Year of birth missing (living people)
American Mizrahi Jews
American Sephardic Jews